Alfred Syson (6 April 1880 – 2 August 1952) was a British fencer. He competed in the individual sabre event at the 1912 Summer Olympics.

References

1880 births
1952 deaths
British male fencers
Olympic fencers of Great Britain
Fencers at the 1912 Summer Olympics